Thai nationality law includes principles of both jus sanguinis and jus soli. Thailand's first Nationality Act was passed in 1913. The most recent law dates to 2008.

Jus sanguinis
The law of bloodright is the primary mode of acquiring Thai nationality. Any person who is a child of a mother or a father who possesses Thai nationality is a Thai national at birth under Section 7 of the Thailand Nationality Act.

Jus sanguinis via the paternal line requires a submission to appropriate authorities indicating legitimacy of the child, or a DNA test proving a biological relationship.

Jus soli

The first Thai Nationality Act of 1913 and most subsequent acts have included the principle of jus soli, though at times with various restrictions. The 1952 Nationality Act rescinded the 1913 act's provisions for jus soli, in response to concerns over the integration of the children of Chinese immigrants, but unlimited jus soli was restored just four years later by the 1956 Nationality Act. In 1972, due to illegal immigration from Burma and concerns over communist insurgency in border areas, the Nationality Act was amended to require that both parents be legally resident and domiciled in Thailand for at least five years in order for their child to be granted Thai citizenship at birth, and revoked citizenship from many people who had it under the earlier act. This caused difficulties for members of hill tribes in border areas who were not registered in the 1956 census, since they had no way to prove that their parents were Thai as opposed to having entered the country as refugees.

Article 23 of the 2008 Nationality Act reversed the 1972 act, restoring citizenship to those who had it before, and allowing people born in Thailand before 1992 to apply for Thai citizenship anew. However, applicants have reported various difficulties in getting government officials to process their applications. Following the act's passage, one of the first people to gain citizenship under Article 23 was Fongchan Suksaneh, a child of American missionaries to the Mlabri people who was born in Chiang Mai Province. Children, neither of whose parents are citizens and at least one of whose parents is an illegal alien, remain not entitled to jus soli citizenship. Furthermore, someone who has Thai citizenship by sole virtue of jus soli may still lose Thai citizenship under various conditions of the 2008 act (such as living abroad) which do not apply to people who have Thai citizenship by virtue of jus sanguinis. In 2013, the Ministry of Interior proposed new immigration regulations, based on Section 7 of the 2008 Nationality Act, to declare children who did not gain Thai citizenship at birth as illegal immigrants and have them deported.

Naturalisation
The strictness of Thailand's requirements for naturalisation have varied over the years, beginning with fairly loose restrictions, which were tightened in the mid-20th century before being loosened again. The Nationality Act of 1939 tightened the requirements, stipulating that applicants for naturalisation had to abandon their foreign names and take Thai names, as well as send their children to Thai schools; these rules were part of a broader trend of laws designed to promote the assimilation of the Thai Chinese community. From 1935 to 1958, a total of 4,652 Chinese naturalised as Thai citizens. More than half of the naturalisations occurred in 1943 alone, during the Japanese occupation of Thailand, apparently driven by the desire to escape wartime restrictions on foreigners.

Under the 1992 Nationality Act, naturalisation as a Thai citizen requires five years of residence in Thailand, as well as proof of a certain minimum income and a declaration of intent to renounce one's previous citizenship. The period of residence is reduced to three years for foreign women married to Thai men. In 2003, 48 people applied for naturalisation, of whom ten were approved.

Under Section 99 of the 2007 Constitution of Thailand, a naturalised citizen does not gain the  right to vote until five years after naturalisation; under Sections 101, 115, 174, and 205, naturalised citizens have no right at all to stand for election to the House of Representatives or the Senate, or to be appointed as a minister or a justice of the Constitutional Court.

Citizenship status
Thai nationality can generally be divided into three levels of citizenship: 

 Both parents must be Natural-born-citizen, a Commissioned officer requirement.
 Natural-born-citizen, is reserved for political careers and some government work (such as judiciary, attorney, police etc.).
 Naturalized person, a person who is naturalized as a Thai must have obtained Thai nationality for at least five years to be eligible to vote.

Statelessness
 there were 443,862 stateless people in Thailand who were born in Thailand and live there. Mostly they are from hill tribes or are the children of illegal migrants, most of them from Myanmar. Stateless people in Thailand suffer serious disadvantages. Unlike Thai citizens, they cannot use government facilities where they must first show an ID card. They cannot go to a clinic or hospital for treatment of illness or injury. They cannot open a bank account. They cannot buy and use a smartphone, or own and drive a car, or buy property or a home. Some progress is being made, but "...these efforts are halfhearted and plagued with bureaucratic hurdles" according to the Bangkok Post. It gives as an example a new law, passed in 2008, that grants Thai citizenship to stateless people. But it applies only to those who were born before 26 February 1992, thus impacting the young most harshly. The good news is that stateless children can now attend state schools. Also, a new law allows stateless people to seek employment in professions not explicitly reserved for Thais. State hospitals now issue birth certificates to all children, a formality often neglected in the past. Importantly, the Thai military government has adopted the goal of "zero statelessness" by 2024.

Dual nationality
There is some confusion regarding the issue of holding Thai dual nationality, largely owing to outdated preconceptions or confused interpretations about what the Thai nationality act states on the matter.

As the law currently stands, a Thai citizen who is born with another nationality, a person who naturalizes as a Thai, or a Thai who takes a foreign citizenship are generally allowed to maintain their Thai citizenship without issue.

The main categories of people this affects includes the following:

–  Dual national children: A major misconception is that a child born with Thai and a foreign nationality must, at the age of 20, choose to renounce their foreign nationality if they wish to remain a Thai citizen. However, Section 14 of the Thai nationality act actually does not force a renunciation, but merely gives a one-year window following that persons 20th birthday for renunciation. If no application is made for renunciation in that one year window, there is also no penalty for not making a ‘choice’.

– Thai women taking their spouse's nationality:  Prior to the 3rd revision to the Thai nationality act in 1992, Thai women who did take up the nationality of their foreign spouse did automatically lose their Thai citizenship. However, Section 13 of the current act effectively allows a person in this situation to keep both nationalities, and Thai citizenship is only lost if she makes a formal request for renunciation.

– Foreign women taking their Thai husband nationality: Female foreigners who naturalize as Thai's are also generally able to keep their foreign citizenship unless their original country prohibits it. However, Thai nationality may be stripped from them if they were found to make a false declaration in their Thai citizenship application, makes use of their former nationality (which mainly means using their foreign passport to enter Thailand); have lived outside of Thailand for more than five years; does anything prejudicial to the Thai state, national security or public order; or retains the nationality of a state at war with Thailand.

See also
Mong Thongdee

Notes

References

Further reading

External links
Full Text of the Nationality Act No. 4, B.E. 2551 (2008 AD), translation by Bongkot Napaumporn of the United Nations High Commission for Refugees

 
Law of Thailand